Onix Cardona Concepción Cardona (born October 5, 1957), is a Puerto Rican former Major League Baseball (MLB) shortstop. He is the cousin of former MLB player José Lind.

Career
Concepcion played for two teams during his seven-year career: the Kansas City Royals (1980–1985) and Pittsburgh Pirates (1987).  Concepcion made his major league debut on August 30, 1980, and played his final game on April 7, 1987.

Concepcion was a member of the Royals team that won the World Series in 1985. He scored the game-tying run in the bottom of the ninth inning of Game 6 on a single by Dane Iorg, which also drove in Jim Sundberg to win the game.

See also
 List of Major League Baseball players from Puerto Rico

References

External links

1957 births
Living people
Bakersfield Outlaws players
Fort Myers Royals players
Gulf Coast Royals players
Harrisburg Senators players
Jacksonville Suns players
Kansas City Royals players
Major League Baseball players from Puerto Rico
Major League Baseball shortstops
Major League Baseball second basemen
Major League Baseball third basemen
Omaha Royals players
People from Dorado, Puerto Rico
Pittsburgh Pirates players